Bibhab Kumar Talukdar is an Indian conservation biologist. He is the founder of Aaranyak, a leading wildlife non-governmental organization based in Guwahati, India. It is a Scientific, Industrial Research and frontline environmental organization in India.

He is a member of the Asian Rhino Specialist Group of the IUCN and a member of the National Board of Wildlife under the government of India. He worked in the monitoring of Asian Rhinos and their habitats. Working in South and South-East Asia, he studied the threats posed to Asian Rhinos due to the impact of climate change.

Early life
Bibhab Kumar Talukdar appeared for his Bachelor of Science examinations in 1989. During this time, he founded Aaranyak in Assam as a nature club encouraging and engaging youths in birding. Assam was amid political unrest during the 1980s and early 1990s. Aaranyak came as a piece of positive news during this period. It is now Northeast India's biggest non-government biodiversity conservation & research organisation.

Life description

Bibhab Kumar Talukdar is currently the secretary general and CEO of Aaranyak. The Aaranyak team consists of wildlife biologists, researchers and conservation workers and has its headquarters in Guwahati, India.

He was a member of the Standing Committee of the National Board of Wildlife, Govt. of India from July 2007 until May 2010.  From 2010 to 2012, he was a member of the Project Elephant Steering Committee, Govt. of India and the committee for the formulation of the National Wildlife Action Plan for 2017–2031.

He is a member of the Assam State Biodiversity Board.

Work in Asian Rhino conservation

Bibhab Kumar Talukdar was appointed as the Chair of the Asian Rhino Specialist Group in 2007 for his work towards the conservation of Asian Rhinos.

He also contributed to the conservation and management of critically endangered Javan and Sumatran Rhinos along with Indonesian conservation agencies.

To curb the occurrences of rhino poaching and for awareness of its conservation, Bibhab Kumar Talukdar initiated legal orientation workshops for forest officials starting in 1998. He coordinated legal orientation workshops for Assam police, Sasashtra Seema Bal (SSB) and Border Security forces (BSF) in his state.

Awards

 IUCN Species Survival Commission Chair's Citation Award, 2008 
 Ashoka Fellow (since 2007)

Publications

He has published over 60 scientific papers and co-authored two papers published in the journal of Science. He contributed to the Millennium Ecosystem Assessment in the Eastern Himalayas between 2002 and 2004.

Selected works

 Talukdar B.K. in Schipper et al. 2008. Status of the World's Land and Marine Mammals: Diversity, Threat, and Knowledge. Science 322: 225-230 
 Talukdar, B.K. in Hoffmann et al. 2010. The Impact of Conservation on the Status of the World's Vertebrates. Science 330:1503-1509.
 Talukdar, B and Sinha, S 2013. Challenges and opportunities of transboundary rhino conservation in India and Nepal. Pachyderm 54(54):45-51 
 Lahkar, B., Talukdar, B. and Sarma, P. 2011. Invasive species in grassland habitat: An ecological threat to the greater one-horned rhino (Rhinoceros unicornis). Pachyderm 49(1) 
 Havmøller, R.G., Junaidi Payne, Widodo Ramond, Susie Ellis, K. Yoganand, BarneyLong, Eric Dinerstein, Christy Williams, Rudi H. Putra, Jamal Gawi, and Bibhab Kumar Talukdar 2015. Will current conservation responses save the Critically Endangered Sumatran rhinoceros Dicerorhinus sumatrensis? Oryx (Oryx, Page 1 of 5 © 2015 Fauna & Flora International )
 Emslie, R.H.; Milliken, T.; Talukdar, B.; Burgess, G.; Adcock, K.; Balfour, D.; Knight, M.H., 2019. African and Asian rhinoceroses - status, conservation and trade. A report from the IUCN Species Survival Commission (IUCN/SSC) African and Asian Rhino Specialist Groups and TRAFFIC to the CITES Secretariat pursuant to Resolution Conf. 9.14 (Rev. CoP17). Report to CITES 17th meeting (Colombo, June 2019), CoP 18 Doc. annexe annex 3: 1-38

References

Scientists from Assam
Gauhati University alumni
1968 births
Living people
Ashoka Fellows